The men's singles snooker competition at the 2001 World Games took place from 22 to 26 August 2001 at the Selion Plaza in Akita, Japan.

Last 16

Last 8

References

Snooker - men's singles
World Games
Snooker at the World Games